League table for teams participating in Ykkönen, the second tier of the Finnish Soccer League system, in 1984.

League table

Promotion/relegation playoff

Elo Kuopio - KPV Kokkola  2-1
KPV Kokkola - Elo Kuopio  2-0

KPV Kokkola stayed in Premier Division.

See also
Mestaruussarja (Tier 1)

References

Ykkönen seasons
2
Fin
Fin